This page summarizes everything related to Estonian football in the year 2023. It contains information about different league systems, national teams, futsal, beach football and most important transfers.

National teams

Association football

Men

Senior

U19

U17

Women

Senior

U17

Futsal

Men

Senior

U19

Beach

Men

Senior

League system

Association football

Men

Premium liiga 

Relegation play-off:

|}

Esiliiga 

Relegation play-off:

|}

Esiliiga B 

Relegation play-off:

|}

|}

Women

Futsal

Men

Beach

Men

Cup competitions

Association football

Men

Women

Futsal

Men

Beach

Men

European competitions

Association football

Men

Women

Futsal

Men

Beach

Men

County competition

Notable transfers 
Players are listed in an alphabetical order. Players with an "*" behind their name have changed teams inside and outside of Meistriliiga. Player's last team is listed as "free agent" if he has not represented a team in the previous six months. Player's next team is listed as "free agent" if he has not found a new club within the following six months.

Inside Meistriliiga 
Listed are players, who have joined or left a club participating in the 2023 Meistriliiga. The player must have represented the Estonian national team at least once. The list may also contain more known players, who have either changed their club inside the lower leagues or retired from football.

Outside Meistriliiga 
Listed are all Estonian footballers, who have joined or left a foreign team.

Foreign players 
Listed are all foreign players that have joined or left a team participating in the 2023 Meistriliiga.

Managerial changes 
Listed are all clubs, who play in the top divisions (Meistriliiga, Esiliiga, Esiliiga B), and national teams who changed managers after the end of the 2022 season.

References 

 
2023 in association football
Seasons in Estonian football